Pietrarubbia is a comune (municipality) in the Province of Pesaro e Urbino in the Italian region Marche, located about  west of Ancona and about  southwest of Pesaro.

It is home to an 11th-century castle which, according to tradition, is the ancestral home of the house of Montefeltro, rulers of the area in the Middle Ages and the Renaissance.

Neighboring municipalities: Carpegna, Frontino, Macerata Feltria, Montecopiolo, Piandimeleto.

References

Cities and towns in the Marche